"Old Main," Goethean Hall, and Diagnothian Hall, also known as the Original Buildings of Franklin & Marshall College, are three historic academic buildings located on the campus of Franklin & Marshall College in Lancaster, Lancaster County, Pennsylvania.  "Old Main" was built between 1854 and 1856, and is a three-story, T-shaped building with three-story lateral wings.  It features a four-story, square entrance tower with five-story octagonal turrets. The chapel was enlarged in 1874. Goethean Hall and Diagnothian Hall flank "Old Main" and were completed in 1857.  They are  stories tall, with steeply pitched gable roofs and stepped gables.  The buildings all reflect the Gothic Revival architectural style.

It was added to the National Register of Historic Places in 1975.

References

University and college buildings on the National Register of Historic Places in Pennsylvania
National Register of Historic Places in Lancaster, Pennsylvania
University and college academic buildings in the United States